Alexander Alexandrovich Goloborodko (born September 28, 1938) is a Soviet and Russian actor of theater and cinema, People's Artist of the RSFSR (1988).

Early life and education
Alexander Goloborodko was born on September 28, 1938 in Dniprodzerzhynsk.

Goloborodko began acting in amateur productions when still at school. In 1960 he graduated from  Kiev Theater Institute.

Career
After graduation, Goloborodko was accepted into the Crimean Russian Drama Theater acting troupe. In 1971, he became an artist of Lesya Ukrainka National Academic Theater of Russian Drama. In 1976, at the invitation of Mikhail Tsarev, he moved to the Maly Theater. In 1985 he moved to the troupe of Mossovet Theatre.

In the movie debuted in 1967 in the movie The Andromeda Nebula.

 he was president of the Sozvezdie / Constellation International Film Festival, and vice-president of the Russian Guild of Film Actors.

Personal life
His wife is an actress of the Mossovet Theater, Svetlana Shershnyova, and their daughter is actress and TV presenter Oksana Goloborodko.

Selected filmography 
 The Andromeda Nebula (1967) as Ren Boz
 Viimne reliikvia (1969) as Gabriel
 Eleven Hopes (1975) as Lavrenyov
 Waiting for Love (1981) as watcher
 Battle of Moscow (1985) as Konstantin Rokossovsky
  (1990) as Grigory Orlov
 Stalingrad (1990) as Konstantin Rokossovsky

References

External links

1938 births
Living people
People from Kamianske
Russian male film actors
Soviet male film actors
Russian male stage actors
Soviet male stage actors
People's Artists of the RSFSR
Recipients of the USSR State Prize
Kyiv National I. K. Karpenko-Kary Theatre, Cinema and Television University alumni
Recipients of the Order of Honour (Russia)
Recipients of the title of Merited Artist of Ukraine